Oidaematophorus trachyphloeus is a moth of the family Pterophoridae that is found in Costa Rica, Guatemala and Panama.

The forewings are mottled grey brown and ochreous. The hindwings and fringes are brown grey. Adults are on wing in May and September.

References

Oidaematophorini
Moths described in 1926
Moths of Central America